Kent-Sussex Line Branch is a  long 2nd order tributary to the Nanticoke River in Sussex County, Delaware.  The lower part of this branch flows along the Kent and Sussex County line, hence the name.

Variant names
According to the Geographic Names Information System, it has also been known historically as:
Beaverdam Ditch

Course
Kent-Sussex Line Branch rises about 1 mile south of Six Forks, Delaware in Kent County and then flows south-southwest into Sussex County to join the Nanticoke River about 2 miles northeast of Greenwood.

Watershed
Kent-Sussex Line Branch drains  of area, receives about 45.6 in/year of precipitation, has a topographic wetness index of 751.96 and is about 9% forested.

See also
List of Delaware rivers

References

Rivers of Delaware
Rivers of Sussex County, Delaware
Rivers of Kent County, Delaware
Tributaries of the Nanticoke River